Bagneux British Cemetery is a Commonwealth War Graves Commission cemetery in the département of the Somme, in Picardy in northern France. It lies to the south of the village of Gezaincourt, near the town of Doullens.
It was established in April 1918 following the end of the German offensive in Picardy, and was formally laid out by Sir Edwin Lutyens. There are 1,374 Commonwealth service personnel of World War I buried here, comprising:
 1,145 British
 181 New Zealanders
 46 Canadians
 1 Australian
 1 British Indian
The dead were principally from two British and a Canadian field hospital. Several graves in Plot III, Row A, were of casualties from a German air raid on Doullens on 30 May 1918.

References

External links
 

Commonwealth War Graves Commission cemeteries in France
Cemeteries in Somme (department)
World War I cemeteries in France
Works of Edwin Lutyens in France